Gerhard Klopfer (18 February 1905 – 29 January 1987) was a senior official of the Nazi Party and assistant to Martin Bormann in the Office of the Party Chancellery.

Klopfer was born in Schreibersdorf, Silesia (now in Poland), in 1905. He studied law and economics and in 1931 became a judge in Düsseldorf, Germany. When the Nazis came to power in 1933, he joined the Nazi Party and the SA (Sturmabteilung) along with the Gestapo (Secret State Police) the following year. In 1935, he became a member of Rudolf Hess's staff and the SS (Schutzstaffel) with the honorary SS rank of Oberführer (Senior Colonel). In 1938, he became responsible for the seizing of Jewish businesses, for questions about mixed marriages between Gentile and Jewish Germans, and general questions about occupation of foreign states.

As State Secretary of the Parteikanzlei (Party Chancellery), Klopfer represented Martin Bormann, who was head of the Parteikanzlei, at the Wannsee Conference on 20 January 1942 in which the details of the "Final Solution of the Jewish Question" were formalised, policies that culminated in the Holocaust. Along with Helmuth Friedrichs, Klopfer was the highest-ranking bureaucrat behind Bormann in the Chancellery. This position gave him extensive power of patronage within the Nazi Party as Martin Bormann often left appointments to party positions to Klopfer and Friedrichs. In this position he was also responsible as signatory for the concept of final call to arms of the underaged and elders in the age range of 16 – 60 years "Volkssturm" in the final stage of the war.

In 1944, he was promoted to SS-Gruppenführer.

As the Red Army closed in on Berlin in 1945, Klopfer fled the city. He was captured and imprisoned and was charged with war crimes but was released because it was deemed he did not have enough influence within the Nazi regime to have affected the Holocaust. He became a tax advisor in the city of Ulm (Baden-Württemberg) in 1952 and retrieved his Admission to the Bar in 1956 in order to practice as a lawyer. He was the last surviving attendee of the Wannsee Conference, dying in 1987. When he died in 1987, his family published a death notice that celebrated “a fulfilled life that was to the benefit of all those who came under his sphere of influence.”

Klopfer was portrayed by Ian McNeice in the BBC/HBO made-for-cable film Conspiracy in  2001.

References

1905 births
1987 deaths
Nazi Party officials
People from the Province of Silesia
Holocaust perpetrators
Sturmabteilung personnel
Gestapo personnel
SS-Gruppenführer
Nazi Party politicians